Sybil Beatrice Spencer born Sybil Beatrice Armitage (29 March 1908 – 1994) was a British gardener. With her husband and son she created the York Gate Garden. After the deaths of her son and her husband she cared for the garden for twelve years leaving it to a charity to be shared by visitors.

Life
Spencer was born in Leeds and her parents were Mary Jane (born Ellis) and Nathaniel Newburn Armitage. Her father was a pharmacist. She trained at RADA.

In 1951 the York Gate house at Adel near Leeds was purchased. At the time it was surrounded by fields. A garden was built consisting of different "rooms" in the Arts and Crafts style. The success of the garden was its design and Sybil's skill as a gardener. The garden surrounds three sides of the house and her husband Frederick, who was a surveyor, designed the garden's rooms to be accessible from the main path. There are over a dozen of these rooms.

After the early death of her son, Robin, when he has 47 she took over the management of the garden. Like her, Robin was a skilled plantsperson, but he had also collected an old water pump, griffin statues and cruck beams for the garden which were recycled from a local chapel.

Death and legacy

When she died in 1994 she left the garden to the Gardeners' Royal Benevolent Society in order that it should be shared with others. The small garden that her family built is said to be one of England's best. The garden continues to be developed and it has gained a Mediterranean garden created by Alistair Baldwin and the head gardener.

In 2021 the garden had eight full time staff and 100 volunteers maintaining the garden.

References

1908 births
1994 deaths
British philanthropists
Horticulturists
People from Leeds